Anne Valerie Hash (born 1971) is a French haute couture fashion designer.

Biography
She graduated from the Chambre Syndicale de la Couture Parisienne in 1995, and designed for such other labels as Nina Ricci, Chloé, and Chanel. In 1995, she opened a small bridal business. Five years later, she became business partners with Philippe Elkoubi, and launched a signature collection of handmade and ready-to-wear pieces, inspired by 14-year-old Parisian, Lou Liza Lesage. She presented her first collection in 2001.

For the 2014 Fall fashion season, her label will not present any collection.

Exhibitions
In 2016, The Cité de la Dentelle et de la Mode of Calais (France) is hosting an exhibition on the creations of Anne Valérie Hash. This exhibition - the first dedicated to her in France – takes a look at her first 13 years of designing. "Anne Valérie Hash. Décrayonner" explore of a world still under construction.

References

External links

Anne Valérie Hash, New York Fashion Biography

1971 births
Living people
French fashion designers
French women fashion designers
Haute couture